George W. Tibbetts (January 22,1845 – March 8,1924) was a merchant and hops farmer in Washington during the mid-to-late 19th century. He was known as a critic of Chinese labor being used in place of white labor.

Riot in Issaquah
Tibbetts served as Justice of the Peace in Squak, Washington, which is present day Issaquah. He gave a firsthand account to early historian of the west Hubert Howe Bancroft of the violence against Chinese hops pickers on the night of September 7, 1885 in Squak.

Tibbetts was charged as an accessory in relation to the case because he refused to help the Chinese on their way to the Wold brothers' farm but nothing ever came of the charges.

Tibbetts in the lodges
Before the violence of 1885 Tibbetts helped found multiple lodges around the region. In October 1874 he helped charter one of the King County's earliest Patrons of Husbandry lodges. Later, after the violence at Squak, he chartered several other lodges in the Issaquah area. By the time it was called Gilman, no longer Squak, Tibbetts was a charter member of the Gilman Odd Fellows Lodge. In 1890 he was an original member of the Knights of Pythias lodge in Issaquah.

Mercantile work
Tibbetts owned several businesses in Issaquah and was a well known merchant. In 1881 he built a large store and a hotel on his farm. The next year he established a stage coach line from Newcastle to Squak and eventually to North Bend. He operated his coach line in conjunction with the Columbia and Puget Sound Railroad.

After the town of Squak/Gilman/Issaquah was platted Tibbetts built a two story building and moved his business into it. This was Issquah's first mercantile house, it would later be occupied by the Issaquah Coal Company.

In 1878 Tibbetts took over as town Postmaster from William Pickering, who had served since 1870. Tibbetts moved the post office into his store and remained in the position until 1886. In 1888 he, along with Isaac Cooper, Thomas Rowley and William Moore organized the Issaquah Water Company.

References
 White and Indian hop pickers attack Chinese: The Online Encyclopedia of Washington State
 History of King County Washington: By Clarence B. Bagley (1929). Now in Public Domain, Chapter 47: Issaquah, Pages 779-780
 History of King County Washington: By Clarence B. Bagley (1929). Now in Public Domain, Chapter 47: Issaquah, Pages 779-780

1845 births
1924 deaths
History of Washington (state)
People from Issaquah, Washington